Fulakora minima is a species of ants described by Kusnezov (1955) from males collected in Tucumán, Argentina, and originally placed in its own genus, Paraprionopelta.

References

Amblyoponinae
Hymenoptera of South America